Raed Wahesh (born in Damascus in 1981) is a Palestinian-Syrian writer, poet and journalist. To date he has published four volumes of verse. Wahesh has developed over the years into a political writer who addresses social issues and makes a theme of war and destruction in his homeland. He has been supporting the Syrian revolution in his writings.

Raed Wahesh moved in 2013 to Germany, where he was initially a guest in the Heinrich Böll House. He now lives in Hamburg.

Work

Wahesh has worked as a cultural editor for various Arabic-language newspapers and websites. His 2015 prose volume A Missing Piece of Damascus Sky is based on his experiences during the revolution. His most recent texts deal with issues of exile, expulsion and deracination. Raed Wahesh fled Syria in 2013 and came to Germany, where he was initially a guest in the Heinrich Böll House. He now lives in Hamburg.

Publications
Publications (poetry):
 Walking We Meet. Walking We Part, Milano 2016
 When the War Did not Happen, Amman 2012
 No One Dreams As Anyone, Damascus 2008
 White Blood, Damascus 2005
 A Missing Piece of Damascus’ Sky, Cairo 2015 (prose)

References

21st-century Palestinian poets
Syrian political journalists
1981 births
Living people
Syrian poets
Palestinian male poets
Syrian people of Palestinian descent
21st-century male writers
Syrian emigrants to Germany